1º de Mayo (English: 1 May) is a station of the Seville Metro on line 1. It is located at the intersection of Federico Mayo Gayarre and Ronda del Tamarguillo avenues in the district of Cerro-Amate. 1º de Mayo is an underground station situated between Gran Plaza and Amate on the same line. It was opened on 2 April 2009. It is expected that by 2017 the station will have a connection with line 4 of the subway (that it is still in planning phase).

See also
 List of Seville metro stations

References

External links 
  Official site.
 History, construction details and maps.

Seville Metro stations
Railway stations in Spain opened in 2009